Davudabad (also Romanized as Dāvūdābād; also known as Shahīd Rajā'ī and Shahrak-e Shahīd Rajā'ī) is a village in Ben Moala Rural District, in the Central District of Shush County, Khuzestan Province, Iran. At the 2006 census, its population was 84, in 21 families.

References 

Populated places in Shush County